Debora Vogel (1902–1942) was a Polish-Jewish philosopher and poet. During World War I her family fled to Vienna and moved later to Lviv (formerly known as Lemberg), where Vogel spent most of her life. She studied Philosophy and Psychology at the Jan Kazimierz University (now Ivan Franko National University of Lviv).

Biography
Vogel was born to a Polish-speaking Jewish family in Burshtyn, Galicia (now Ukraine). During her time at the Lwów Jewish gymnasium, she was active in the Zionist youth movement. She later studied philosophy in Vienna and Polish literature in Krakow. In 1926 she obtained her Ph.D., with a doctoral dissertation on influence of Hegel's aesthetics upon Józef Kremer. After completing her education, she taught psychology at a college in Lwów.

Vogel began writing poetry while at the university, initially in German, and later Yiddish. She moved about in Yiddish literary circles and contributed articles for several Yiddish journals, including Sygnały and Wiadmosci Literackie. She was also a contributor of essays, art reviews, poetry, and essays on poetry to Tsushtayer, a short-lived Lwów Yiddish journal of literature and art.

She became a correspondent and close friend of writer and painter Bruno Schulz.

World War I forced Vogel's family to flee to Vienna. From there they moved to Lwów, where Vogel would spend the majority of her life. In 1932 Vogel married a Lwów architect and engineer named Barenblit, and their only son, Anshel, was born in 1937. Together with her husband and son, she was killed in the Lwów ghetto in 1942.

Work

Vogel was a prolific poet and essayist. Her most famous poems are ″You are Light and Bowing,″ (1929), ″Day-Figures″ (1930), ″Mannequins″ (1934), ″Legend of Silver″ (1935). She also wrote some prose. These include Acacias Bloom (1935), Fragments of a Montage-Novel (1936), and Military Parade (1938). 
Vogel's essays include; Theme and Form in the Art of Chagall (1929), ′White Words′ in Poetry (1931), Stasis, Dynamics and Contemporaneity in Art (1936) and The Literary Genre of Montage (1937).

Her poetic legacy is marked for its experimental spirit. Her poems, mostly written in the 1930s, reflect the radical and minimalistic outlook that all art aspired toward during this period in history. Her experiment in poetry was mostly about fusing poetry and art. She called this technique 'white words,' and described it as an attempt to "create a new lyric poetry of the urban condition." This style was, however, not liked by critics both during her lifetime and later, who considered it too intellectual, obscure and devoid of feminist themes. Vogel responded to such claims by stating that her style was not deliberate, but an outcome necessitated by life's experiences.

References

Further reading
 
 Poems from Tog-Figurn in English translation

Jews from Galicia (Eastern Europe)
People from the Kingdom of Galicia and Lodomeria
Polish poets
Austro-Hungarian Jews
People from Burshtyn
1902 births
1942 deaths
Polish civilians killed in World War II
Polish Jews who died in the Holocaust
People who died in the Lwów Ghetto